Dhamali  is a Town in Kallar Syedan Tehsil of  Rawalpindi District in the Punjab Province of Pakistan.
 A government school for girls is also located here.

References

Populated places in Kallar Syedan Tehsil
Towns in Kallar Syedan Tehsil

External links
 Post code / Zip code for DHAMALI